Promised Land is a 1987 drama film written and directed by Michael Hoffman and starring Kiefer Sutherland and Meg Ryan. The film is set in Utah. It was the first film to be commissioned by the Sundance Film Festival, and uses the drama over economic class and manhood to critique the Reagan Administration. The movie was referenced in the movie Dreamcatcher.

Plot
The film opens by following two American high school acquaintances, a few years after graduation. They are now suffering from deep anger and anguish, because they are not as successful as they hoped to be.

David Hancock is the high school basketball star who gets into college on an athletic scholarship only to lose the scholarship to a better player. Unable to succeed in college based on his academic merit, he returns to his hometown, becomes a police officer and is slowly moving into a middle-class mediocrity with his cheerleader girlfriend, Mary Daley, who is in college and plans to major in the arts. Hancock is still stewing over the fact that he is no longer the sports star and that his girlfriend is not only reluctant to marry him but may end up being more successful than he.

Danny Rivers is the academic "nerd" who was supposedly destined to be so successful that he earned the nickname "Senator". It was felt by some that one day he would become a decent and just politician. He has returned home with his unrestrained, unpredictable, overbearing bride, Bev Sykes.

After a quick Christmas Eve reunion with his parents, Danny learns that his father is dying. He is unable to accept that while he left town with great expectations, he has returned a poor drifter. His desire to run from his problems again, however, prompts Bev to mock his manhood in front of some of his high school friends at a bar and the two decide to hold up a convenience store perhaps as a means for Danny to prove his manhood or because that is just what "Hollywood white trash" would do.

Just then, Hancock, unaware that Danny has returned to town, drives into the store's parking lot arguing with his girlfriend about the future of their relationship. Interrupting the robbery, he fatally shoots Danny and wounds Bev. Hancock then suffers something of an emotional breakdown. Danny and Hancock are shown to really have little in common except that Danny once had a crush on Mary and perhaps a repressed crush on Hancock.

As other police officers and paramedics arrive on scene, Hancock drives with his girlfriend to an open field where he had previously shared, with his police partner, some of his frustrations. He screams to Mary how he feels he has been lied to while growing up.

Later Hancock has to personally inform Danny's father that he has killed his son.

Cast

Production
Promised Land was filmed in Reno, Nevada and various locations in Utah, with the assistance of the Sundance Institute, and Robert Redford is credited as one of two executive producers. The Utah cities of Salt Lake, Midvale and Lehi are cited in the closing credits. Parts of the film were also shot in Wendover and Provo, Utah.

References

External links
 
 

1987 films
1987 drama films
American drama films
Vestron Pictures films
Films directed by Michael Hoffman
Films scored by James Newton Howard
Films about police officers
Films set in Utah
Films shot in Nevada
Films shot in Utah
1980s police films
1980s police procedural films
American police films
1980s English-language films
1980s American films